

1980
 Abul Hussain (literature)
 Bedaruddin Ahmad (music)
 Mohammad Abdul Jabbar (music)
 Hamidur Rahman (art)
 Murtaja Baseer (art)
 Ronen Kushari (drama)
 Mujibur Rahman Khan (journalism)
 Mohammad Ferdous Khan (education)

1981
 Abu Rushd Matinuddin (literature)
 Aminul Islam (fine arts)
 Abdul Halim Chowdhury (music)
 Mumtaz Ali Khan (music)
 Gauhar Jamil (dance)
 Mohammad Zakaria (drama)
 Zahur Hossain Chowdhury (journalism)
 Obaidul Huq (journalism)
 Mustafa Nurul Islam (literature)

1982
 Syed Ali Ahsan (literature)
 Abul Hasan (literature)
 Talim Hossain (literature)
 Abdul Hakim (education)
 Ful Mohammad (music)
 SM Sultan (fine arts)
 G A Mannan (literature)
 Sanaullah Nuri (journalism)

1983
 Shawkat Osman (literature)
 Sanaul Huq (literature)
 Abdul Gaffar Chowdhury (literature)
 M A Kuddus (education)
 Shahidullah Kaisar (journalism)
 Syed Nur Uddin (journalism)
 Abu Jafar Shamsuddin (literature)
 Mohammad Kibria (painting)
 Barin Mazumder (music)
 Muhammad Mansuruddin

1984
 Anisuzzaman (education)
 Habibur Rahman (education)
 Syed Waliullah (literature)
 Hasan Hafizur Rahman (literature)
 Syed Shamsul Huq (literature)
 Rashid Karim (literature)
 Sikandar Abu Zafar (journalism)
 Mir Qasim Khan (music)
 Sabina Yasmin (music)
 Qayyum Chowdhury (fine arts)

1985
 Abu Zafar Obaidullah (literature)
 Gazi Shamsur Rahman (literature)
 Abdullah Al-Muti (science)
 Govinda Chandra Dev (education)
 Mohammad Abdul Jabbar (education)
 Kalim Sharafi (music)
 Abed Hossain Khan (music)
 Syed Jahangir (fine arts)

1986
 Alauddin Al Azad (literature)
 Al Mahmud (literature)
 Satyen Sen 
 Askar Ibne Shaikh (literature)
 Munshi Raisuddin (music)
 Mobarak Hossain Khan (music)
 Dhir Ali Miah (music)

1987
 Mohammad Moniruzzaman (literature)
 Abu Hena Mustafa Kamal (music)
 Anis Siddiqui
 Jahanara Arzu (literature)
 Ahmad Shamsul Islam (education)
 M. A. Naser (education)
 Principal Abul Kashem (education)
 Nurul Islam Patowary (journalism)
 Ahmed Humayun (journalism)
 Kanailal Shil (instrumental music)
 Farida Parveen (music)
 Syed Mainul Hossain (architecture)

1988
 Bonde Ali Miah (literature)
 Ashraf Siddiqui (literature)
 Fazal Shahabuddin (literature)
 Anwar Hossain (drama)
 Sudhin Das (music)

1989
 Shahed Ali (literature)
 Razia Mazid (literature)
 Mahmud Shah Koreshi (education)
 Mohammad Asafudowlah Reza (journalism)
 AKM Shahidul Huq (journalism)
 Abdur Razzak (fine arts)
 Amalendu Biswas (drama act)

References 

Civil awards and decorations of Bangladesh
Recipients of the Ekushey Padak